The Pico Basilé National Park is a protected area with the status of national park on the island of Bioko in the northern part of the African country of Equatorial Guinea,  near the Gulf of Guinea, in the Atlantic Ocean. It stands out for its diversity of landscapes and vegetation and especially for its population of primates, that are threatened by the illegal hunting. Although in 2007 the government of that country prohibited the hunting of diverse species, international organizations have shown concern for the noncompliance of the decree.

The park is named after the  Basilé peak, the highest in Equatorial Guinea, with 3011 m (9878 feet). Administratively it is included within the jurisdiction of the Equatorial Guinean province of Bioko Norte.

It covers an area of 30 thousand hectares and was formally established in 2000.

The government of Equatorial Guinea is taking action to promote sustainable hunting in the park, which would encourage the development of the local rural community.

References

National parks of Equatorial Guinea
Protected areas established in 2000